An epigram is a short poem with a clever twist, or a concise and witty statement.

Epigram may also refer to:
 Epigram (programming language), a functional programming language with dependent types
 Epigram (newspaper), the independent student newspaper of the University of Bristol
 Epigram (horse), Canadian racehorse
 Epigrams (books), a collection of books by Martial in the 1st century
 Epigram (inscription), an inscription in stone (obsolete)
 Fraszki, a 1584 Polish-language poem collection, sometimes referred to in English as  Epigrams